is a Japanese voice actor who is a member of Arts Vision. He voiced Austria in the Hetalia: Axis Powers series and was the voice of Link in The Legend of Zelda: Twilight Princess.

Filmography

Anime

Video games

Tokusatsu

References

External links
 
 
 
 

Japanese male voice actors
1973 births
Living people
Place of birth missing (living people)
20th-century Japanese male actors
21st-century Japanese male actors
Arts Vision voice actors